Roger Wakeley Kidner (1914–2007) was a railway enthusiast and noted publisher whose imprint, The Oakwood Press, published many of the earliest books on British narrow-gauge railways.

Biography 
Kidner was born on 16 March 1914, the son of civil servant Arthur, and Mabel. His love of railways stemmed from being given a few Locomotive Publishing Company postcards in primary school. He attended Westminster School where he struck up a friendship with Michael Robbins. The two bonded over a shared interest in railways, and in 1931, they founded The Four Os to publish a newsletter called Locomotion. Both were still at school, and the company operated out of Kidner's parents' garage. \

In 1935, Kidner and Robbins changed the name of their nascent publishing house to The Oakwood Press and published their first book, Railway Bibliography by Canon Fellows. This was followed in 1936 by L.T. Catchpole's The Lynton and Barnstaple Railway which is still in print in its 9th edition. Meanwhile, after a year at the London School of Economics Kidner was working as an editor of travel guides for Benn Brothers. In 1938, Oakwood published the first train spotter's guide, called How to Recognise Southern Railway Locomotives written by Kidner.

Kidner travelled widely to research the railways that his authors wrote about. He visited the Lynton and Barnstaple Railway in 1935 with Catchpole, and the Welsh Highland Railway in 1926 and 1934.

The Oakwood Press suspended publication during the Second World War, and Kidner served in the Queen's Own Royal West Kent Regiment where he rose to the rank of Major. He also married Beryl Walton in 1943. After the war he resumed publishing, though was initially restricted by paper rationing. He published James I. C. Boyd's seminal series on the narrow-gauge railways of north Wales, starting in 1949 with Narrow Gauge Rails to Portmadoc which drew attention to the then-closed Ffestiniog Railway and was instrumental in its eventual restoration. Michael Robbins dropped out of the business in the 1950s.

In 1972, Kidner retired from his work in public relations to focus full-time on The Oakwood Press. He broadened the range of subjects covered, to include biographies of railwaymen and books about trams, traction engines, buses and canals. He sold The Oakwood Press in 1984, but kept in close contact with the new owner, writing and editing books. He died of cancer in 2007.

Works

References 

English non-fiction writers
Rail transport writers
Railway historians
Historians of technology
1914 births
2007 deaths
English male non-fiction writers
20th-century English historians
20th-century English male writers